Donald John Bosseler (born January 24, 1936) is a former American football fullback who played in the National Football League for the Washington Redskins from 1957 to 1964.  He played college football at the University of Miami and was drafted in the first round (ninth overall) of the 1957 NFL Draft.  He was inducted into the College Football Hall of Fame in 1990.

Early life
Bosseler attended and played high school football at Batavia High School in Batavia, New York.

College career
Bosseler was a four-year starter at fullback for the University of Miami.  In his senior year, 1956, he helped the team to an 8-1-1 record, was named All-America by the Associated Press, and was MVP in the Senior Bowl.  He rushed for 1,642 yards in his four years. Bosseler was inducted into the University of Miami Sports Hall of Fame in 1970.

Professional career
Bosseler was drafted ninth overall in the 1957 NFL Draft and played for seven seasons with the Washington Redskins before retiring.  In 1959, he was named to the Pro Bowl.

After football
After his football days, Bosseler briefly served as a radio analyst for Miami Dolphins radio broadcasts before joining Prudential Bache in Miami, where he became a vice-president.

References

1936 births
Living people
American football fullbacks
American Football League announcers
College Football Hall of Fame inductees
Eastern Conference Pro Bowl players
Miami Dolphins announcers
Miami Hurricanes football players
People from Wyoming County, New York
Players of American football from New York (state)
Washington Redskins players